Romance is a novel written by Joseph Conrad and Ford Madox Ford. It was the second of their three collaborations. Romance was eventually published by Smith, Elder & Co. in London in 1903 and by McClure, Phillips and Company in New York in March 1904.

According to Max Saunders, Conrad, in his quest to obtain a literary collaborator, had been recommended by several literary figures. W. E. Henley pointed to Ford as a suitable choice for Conrad. Literary collaboration was not particularly uncommon when Conrad proposed it to Ford, but neither was it considered the proper way for serious novelists, as Ford was aware: "The critics of our favoured land do not believe in collaboration." The novel was adapted into the film The Road to Romance.

The collaboration
In his biography of Conrad, Joseph Conrad: A Personal Remembrance (1924), Ford alleges that some opponents and critics did not hold the same reverence for his "literary friendship" with Conrad as that which he maintained.  But his bond with Conrad had been "for its lack of jealousy a very beautiful thing." Indeed, Ford took the position that he gave Conrad some benefit as a bonding partner, writing: "I was useful to Conrad as a writer and as a man in a great many subordinate ways during his early days of struggle and deep poverty..."
In an unpublished section, he withheld a frank passage of confession about his team writer where he contradicts the argument that Conrad "chose to live on terms of intimacy with a parasitic person", stating that such an accusation was as damaging to himself as it was to Conrad. Ford continued in the same vein about the choices open to Conrad, defending himself from criticism and showing awareness of the psychology behind co-writing:

…"if he chose to consult the person as to the most private details of his personal life and – what is still more important – as to the form and the very wording of his books, – if he chose for this intimacy a person of a parasitic type, he was less upright a man than might reasonably be supposed... And less of a psychologist."

A critic and friend of Ford, R. A. Scott-James, reveals in an introduction to one of Ford's works, rather unbelievably, that Ford had spiritedly claimed to have taught Conrad English. Ford made a number of claims about Conrad that may not have been completely true.

The writers' wives were involved behind the scenes in the collaborations, often to the despair of Ford, who omitted any mention of Jessie Conrad in his biography.

Conrad and Ford agreed upon a collaboration on Seraphina, a novel that Ford had already begun work on. Conrad wrote to Ford encouraging him to visit:

"Come when you like ...  You will always find me here.  I would be very pleased to hear Seraphina read.  I would afterwards read it myself.  Consult your own convenience and (especially) your own whim.  It's the only thing worth deferring to."

Another instance where making objections to collaborating occurred when Conrad wrote to Galsworthy commenting: "I am drooping still.  Working at
Seraphina.  Bosh!  Horrors!”   and again after a further bonding session Conrad wrote that Ford's visit had left him "half dead and [he] crawled into bed for two days".

Aftermath
After the collaboration on Romance was finished, it appears that in 1902 Conrad began to feel a sense of loss over working with Ford for he asked him to keep their partnership alive. The relationship between Ford and Conrad broke down in 1909, however, over specific and personal squabbles, including the financial arrangements to enable Ford to publish Conrad's Some Reminiscences. They saw little of each other after that dispute and spoke less frequently.

The text of Romance itself sometimes reflects the reactions of Conrad to the proposal to collaborate on the novel.  When Tomas Castro berates Kemp for failing to take advantage of opportunities to kill their enemies, his reproaches echo Conrad's strong reaction to Ford's rather delicate early draft of the novel.  Any writer, Conrad said, "who could take hold of such a theme and not, gripping it by the throat, extract from it every drop of blood and glamour" can only be a "criminal."   On hearing Ford read aloud from his [Ford's] first draft, Conrad, who "began to groan and writhe in his chair", felt that Ford had failed to extract the maximum effect from the potential of the story outline.

A clear statement of the closeness of their working styles, despite a frenetic literary environment, appears in Ford's letter to Olive Garnett:

"Conrad has a considerable influence on me; I a considerable influence on him, whether for good or ill in either case there is no knowing.  The collaborative work is quite different from either of our personal works, but it takes a sufficiently decided line of its own...Paradoxical as it may sound our temperaments are extraordinarily similar, we speak as nearly in each other's language as it is possible for two inhabitants of this Babel to do."

References
Brebach, Raymond. 1985. Joseph Conrad, Ford Madox Ford, and the Making of Romance. Ann Arbor, MI:  UMI Research Press. 
Geoffrey Clarke "Over His Shoulder" (London: Excalibur Press, 1993).

External links

 Max Saunders, at King's College London

1903 British novels
Collaborative novels
Novels by Joseph Conrad
Novels by Ford Madox Ford
English novels
British novels adapted into films